Spartacus: Gods of the Arena is a television miniseries broadcast by American cable TV Starz, as a  prequel to Spartacus, which premiered January 21, 2011. The series follows the character Gannicus (Dustin Clare), the first gladiator representing Lentulus Batiatus to become Champion of Capua. Cast members and characters reprised from the original series include John Hannah as Batiatus, Lucy Lawless as Lucretia, Peter Mensah as Oenomaus, Nick E. Tarabay as Ashur, Lesley-Ann Brandt as Naevia, Antonio Te Maioha as Barca, and Manu Bennett as Crixus.

The miniseries aired in Canada on Movie Central and The Movie Network, on Sky1 in the United Kingdom and on FX in Latin America.

Cast

Slaves
 Dustin Clare as Gannicus – a Celtic gladiator who is the champion of the Batiatus' ludus.
 Peter Mensah as Oenomaus/Doctore – a Numidian gladiator who later becomes the doctore of Batiatus' gladiators.
 Marisa Ramirez as Melitta – Lucretia's body slave, the wife of Oenomaus.
 Manu Bennett as Crixus – a new Gallic gladiatorial recruit.
 Nick E. Tarabay as Ashur – a new Syrian gladiatorial recruit.
 Shane Rangi as Dagan – a gladiatorial recruit who speaks only Aramaic, and fellow Syrian to Ashur.
 Antonio Te Maioha as Barca – a Carthaginian gladiator.
 Josef Brown as Auctus – a gladiator and Barca's lover.
 Temuera Morrison as Ulpius/Doctore – Oenomaus' predecessor as the trainer of Batiatus' gladiators.
 Lesley-Ann Brandt as Naevia – a young house-slave.
 Jessica Grace Smith as Diona – a house-slave and Naevia's friend who loses her virginity at the whim of Cossutius.

Romans
 John Hannah as Quintus Lentulus Batiatus – a lanista 
 Lucy Lawless as Lucretia – Batiatus' wife.
 Jaime Murray as Gaia – a social climber and Lucretia's friend.
 Craig Walsh Wrightson as Marcus Decius Solonius – Batiatus' close friend who has aspirations of becoming a lanista himself.
 Jeffrey Thomas as Titus Lentulus Batiatus – Quintus Batiatus' father and the pater familias of the House of Batiatus.
 Stephen Lovatt as Tullius – Batiatus' brutal business rival and enemy.
 Gareth Williams as Vettius – owner of a rival ludus and enemy of Batiatus.

Episodes

Production
The opportunity to produce Gods of the Arena emerged when the second season of Spartacus was halted while lead actor Andy Whitfield battled non-Hodgkin lymphoma. Series creator and executive producer Steven S. DeKnight expanded a single flashback episode for the second season into a six-part mini-series. Production for Gods of the Arena began in New Zealand in August 2010.

References

External links

 
 

2010s American drama television miniseries
2011 American television series debuts
2011 American television series endings
2011 American television seasons
American prequel television series
Gladiatorial combat in fiction
Spartacus (TV series)
Starz original programming
Television dramas set in ancient Rome
Television series created by Sam Raimi
Television series set in the 1st century BC